The 1981 West Virginia Mountaineers football team represented West Virginia University in the 1981 NCAA Division I-A football season. It was the Mountaineers' 89th overall season and they competed as a Division I-A Independent. The team was led by head coach Don Nehlen, in his second year, and played their home games at Mountaineer Field in Morgantown, West Virginia. They finished the season with a record of nine wins and three losses (9–3 overall) and with a victory over Florida in the Peach Bowl.

Schedule

Season recap
Oliver Luck was the starting quarterback for the Mountaineers. He led the team with 2448 passing yards and 16 touchdowns. Leading the team in rushing was Curlin Beck with 537 net yards. Rich Hollins led the team in receiving with 37 receptions for 764 yards.

The first game pitted the Mountaineers against the Virginia Cavaliers. The Mountaineers won the opener 32–18 in Charlottesville. WVU then traveled to College Park, where they took on the Maryland Terrapins. WVU held on for a 17–13 road victory.

Their home opener was against Colorado State, who they thrashed 49–3. They then traveled to Boston College, where they won 38–10. Their first loss of the season came at the hands of archrival Pitt 17–0 at home. They rebounded with a resounding 27–6 win over Virginia Tech. They played at Penn State, but lost 7–30, to the number 1 team in the nation.

The Mountaineers returned home for a game with East Carolina, in which they won 20–3. They later on beat Temple by a 24–19 margin. Rutgers was next up, and lost 20–3.

West Virginia barely lost on the road to Syracuse, 24–27, but more than made up for it with a 26–6 thumping of the Florida Gators in the Peach Bowl.

Roster

References

West Virginia
West Virginia Mountaineers football seasons
Peach Bowl champion seasons
West Virginia Mountaineers football